The Baghdad Metro, also known as BET  (Baghdad Elevated Train), is a proposed rapid transit in the form of an elevated railway, for the Iraqi city of Baghdad. Construction is expected to start in 2023/2024 and finish in 2027.

History
In 2017, Metro Report stated that a memorandum of understanding for the development of urban rail projects in Baghdad and Basra had been signed by the Iraqi government and Alstom that year, for a 20 km elevated light rail line in Baghdad that would link Mustansiriyah, Shaab, Wazireya, Alsarafiya bridge, Al-Khadumia, Al-Muthanna airport and Allawi.

In 2019, it was confirmed that a French-South Korean consortium would begin ground work on the metro in 2020, at a cost of $2.5 billion.

In February 2022, it was announced the work would begin on the project in Q2 2022 and will finish in 2027, after sufficient funds for the project have been raised in the 2020-21 budgets and the future 2022 budget, which is still waiting for approval. The announcement came after the awarding of the projects to the French transport giant Alstom and Hyundai of South Korea.

In December 2022, it was announced that the Baghdad Metro would be included in the 2023 Ministry Of Transport budget, the Metro will have 14 stations and will be 31 kilometres in length with construction starting in either 2023 or 2024. An announcement about the project is set to be made in Q1 of 2023.

Previous metro proposals
Saddam Hussein launched the multi-billion-dollar subway project in 1983 to alleviate traffic congestion in Baghdad's streets. Because of the Iran–Iraq War the project could not be finished.

At a December 2002 press conference, Defense Secretary Donald Rumsfeld spoke of "enormous miles and miles and miles of underground tunnelling" that prevented the United Nations from properly inspecting Saddam's WMD stocks. Hussein al-Shahristani, a scientist imprisoned by Saddam, told CBS's 60 Minutes, "We believe now it is more than 100 kilometres of very complex network, multilayer tunnels."

Since the 2003 Iraq War, traffic problems in Baghdad have increased significantly, because of the creation of the Green Zone, and the reduction of car-ownership regulation.
In November 2008, Baghdad mayor Sabir al-Isawi announced plans for a 2-line $US 3 billion expansion of metro services in the city which would be built pending funding. One line would run from Sadr City (previously called Al-Thawra or Saddam City) to A'dhamiya, while the other would link the center of Baghdad with its western suburbs. Each line would have 20 stations. In February 2011, an agreement was signed with Alstom, for the construction of a 25 km line from central Baghdad to the northern suburbs of Adhamiya, Al-Hurriya, Kadhimiya, and Sha'ab. Later in 2011 Alstom and the Iraqi government signed a memorandum of understanding (MOU) for Alstom to design, build and operate a Baghdad–Basra high-speed rail line.

References 

Transport in Baghdad
Rail transport in Iraq
Proposed rapid transit